Wanfang Community station is a station on Brown Line of the Taipei Metro, located in Wenshan District, Taipei, Taiwan.

Station overview
The two-level, elevated station has two side platforms, and has a single exit. It is located on the south side of Wanfang Rd., close to its intersection with Wanhe Rd.

Station layout

Exits
Single Exit: Wanfang Rd.

Around the station
Wanfang Community
Wanfang Elementary School
Yuanye Sports Park

References

Railway stations opened in 1996
Wenhu line stations